Toyota vehicles in Japan are distributed to numerous dealership chains throughout the country. Up to May 2020, each dealership chain had a different product offering, with some models restricted to one chain to maintain exclusivity. Since May 2020, every Toyota model in Japan was available in all dealership chains. Current dealership chains include Toyota Store, Toyopet Store, Toyota Corolla Store and Netz Store.

History 

In Japan in the late 1940s, Toyota's sales department was part of its manufacturing company and had its office in Nagoya.

At that time, the Japanese auto industry was controlled by the US government. The majority of Toyota's sales was composed of trucks and buses. The new car business in Japan was quite limited. There was little need for consumer-oriented branding or consumer-oriented showrooms.

On April 3, 1950, Toyota established a separate company for sales of its motor vehicles, including exports, which was called トヨタ自動車販売株式会社 Toyota Jidōsha Hanbai Kabushiki Gaisha, Toyota Auto Sales Corporation, sometimes abbreviated toトヨタ自販 Toyota Jihan. In 1950, there were 47 sales outlets for Toyota vehicles in Japan.

In 1955, Toyota launched a new style of sedan and named it "Crown".

In 1957, Toyota began manufacturing a slightly smaller and more economical sedan, the Toyota Corona. A separate sales network was created, which became known as "Toyopet Stores" (トヨペット店 Toyopetto-ten), to sell the Corona and Toyopet ToyoAce trucks. It currently features mid-range models. ("Toyota Jidōsha Nihon Kokunai Hanbaimō Nenpyō" Toyota Domestic Vehicle Sales Network Chronology in Japanese.)

To distinguish the Crown showrooms from the Corona showrooms, the Crown showrooms in Japan came to be called "Toyota Stores" (トヨタ店 Toyota-ten). In the 1960s, Toyota Stores added the new luxury car Toyota Century.

 In 1957, Toyota launched a dealership network in Japan for diesel commercial vehicles that it called Toyota Diesel Stores (トヨタディーゼル店 Toyota Dīzeru-ten). Initially, it sold trucks, buses, and forklifts, such as the Toyota Dyna and the Toyota Coaster. Hino products also were sold at Toyota Diesel stores after Toyota acquired that company in 1967. Starting in 1980, the Diesel Stores also sold the Starlet, Corolla, Corona, Vista, and Crown equipped with diesel engines. Toyota Diesel also sold the first generation Tercel, although it was not available with a diesel engine at the time. When the Toyota Diesel store network was disbanded in 1988, commercial vehicles were divided between the Toyota Stores and Toyopet Stores.

"Toyota Publica Stores" (トヨタパブリカ店 Toyota Paburika-ten) were established in 1961 to sell the Toyota Publica. In 1966, that chain of outlets was renamed "Toyota Corolla Stores" (トヨタカローラ店 Toyota Karōra-ten); it sells an economy model, the Toyota Corolla.

The "Toyota Auto Stores" (トヨタオート店 Toyota Ōto-ten) sales network was established in 1967 to sell a Corolla clone called the Toyota Sprinter. "Toyota Vista Stores" (トヨタ・ビスタ) sales network was established in 1980 and a Camry clone called the Toyota Vista was started to sell in 1982. "Toyota Auto Stores" were rebranded as "Netz Toyota" (ネッツトヨタ店 Nettsu-Toyota-ten) in August 1998, and "Toyota Vista Stores" was merged into "Netz Toyota" in 2004. Some former Vista Store models were rebranded as Lexus (レクサス Rekusasu), such as the Altezza and the Aristo, while other products have been taken over by the "Netz Toyota", which was already selling the Toyota ist and the Toyota RAV4. "Netz" stands for "Network of Energetic Teams for Zenith", and targets young buyers.

In 2012, selected Japanese dealerships were given a special designation called "Area 86" that resembled the North American Toyota network, called Scion, to sell the Toyota 86, building on the marketing approach started with WiLL branded products. As of 2017, the "Area 86" network was rebranded as "GR" for Gazoo Racing, sharing a similar approach to the performance division Toyota Racing Development or "TRD", providing various upgrades for the 86, Vitz, Prius, Mark X, Harrier, Noah and Voxy.

In the female idol group, AKB48, Toyota and AKS, has worked together to create a subunit named "Team 8". Team 8 is created with the idea, 'Idols who come to meet you'. They have a total of 47 members, each representing a prefecture of Japan.

Starting in May 2020, models that were exclusive to particular Toyota dealership networks began to be shared with other Toyota dealership networks. Consequently, in Japan a customer can purchase any Toyota new from any of the four dealership groups, while Lexus products remain exclusive to Lexus locations.

List of models sold in the retail channels

The following is a list of all past models, identified with a ☆, and present models, identified with a ★, as well as where they were available at retail channels nationally. Most models were exclusive to particular retail chains, while some models, like the Prius, are available at all sales channels and are identified with a ◎. Retail chains in Tokyo, Osaka and Okinawa are different. The present model availability in specific retail channels are no longer applied since May 2020.

Toyota Store 

Vehicles sold at Toyota Store:

Century★◎, Crown Majesta☆, Crown★◎, Master☆, SAI☆, Mirai★◎, Prius★◎, Aqua★◎, Allion★◎, Succeed☆, Blade☆, Avensis☆, Sienta★◎, Corolla RunX☆, C-HR★◎, Porte★◎, Estima★◎, Isis☆, Roomy★◎, FJ Cruiser☆, Comfort☆, Japan Taxi★◎, Land Cruiser★◎, Hilux Surf★◎, Land Cruiser Prado★◎, Dyna★◎, Stout☆, Esquire★◎, Coaster★◎, QuickDelivery☆, 2000GT☆, Carina☆, Carina ED☆, GT-86★◎, Brevis☆, Gaia☆, Cavalier☆, Classic☆, MasterAce★◎, Hilux★◎, Mega Cruiser☆, Soarer☆, Origin☆, Caldina☆, AA sedan☆, Toyopet SA☆, G1 series truck☆, FA series truck☆, BX series truck☆.

Toyopet Store

Vehicles sold at Toyopet Store:

Mark X☆, SAI☆, Mirai★◎, Premio★◎, Prius★◎, Aqua★◎, Belta☆, Mark X ZiO☆, Succeed☆, Ractis☆, Auris☆, Blade☆, GT-86★◎, Porte★◎, Harrier☆, Vanguard★◎, Esquire★◎, Rush★◎, C-HR★◎, Avensis☆, Alphard☆, Comfort☆, HiAce◎, ToyoAce★◎, Tank★◎, Sienta★◎, Pixis Space★◎, Mark II-Mark II Qualis-Mark II Blit☆, Corona☆, Corona EXiV☆, Corona Coupe☆, Corsa☆, Opa☆, Avalon☆, Progrès☆, Cami☆, ist☆, Platz☆, Soarer☆, Hilux★◎, Cynos☆, Regius☆, Celsior☆, Origin☆, Caldina☆, Ipsum☆.

Toyota Corolla Store

Vehicles sold at Toyota Corolla Store (starting 1966), formerly Toyota Publica Store:

SAI☆, Camry★◎, Prius★◎, Aqua★◎, Corolla Axio★◎, 86★◎, Belta☆, Spade☆, Probox★◎, Corolla Rumion☆, C-HR★◎, Ractis★◎, Passo★◎, Corolla Spacio☆, Sera☆, Vanguard★◎, Roomy★◎, Estima★◎, Noah★◎, Avensis☆, Sienta★◎, TownAce★◎, Pixis★◎, Publica☆, Tercel☆, Windom☆, Scepter☆, Corolla Ceres☆, Origin☆, Nadia☆, WiLL☆, RAV4★◎, Sports 800☆, Celica☆, Supra★◎, Corolla Levin☆, Celica XX☆, Celica Camry☆.

Netz Store

Vehicles sold at Netz Store (starting 1998), formerly Toyota Vista Store (starting 1980), formerly Toyota Auto Store (starting 1967):

Vitz☆, Yaris★◎, SAI☆, Prius★◎, Aqua★◎, ist☆, Auris★◎, bB☆, Avensis☆, Raum☆, Spade★◎, Wish★◎, Voxy★◎, RAV4★◎, C-HR★◎, Kluger★◎, Vellfire★◎, iQ☆, Allex★◎, Tank★◎, Pixis★◎, Fun Cargo☆, Pronard☆, Altezza☆, Verossa☆, Curren☆, Aristo☆, MR-S☆, MR2☆, Starlet☆, Vista☆, Cresta☆, Sprinter☆, Voltz☆, Blizzard☆, Chaser☆, Sprinter Marino☆, Carib☆, Granvia☆, Sprinter Trueno☆, LiteAce★◎, Ipsum☆, GT-86★◎, WiLL (1999–2004)☆.

References

Toyota dealerships
1950 establishments in Japan